Félix Alphonse Raugel (27 November 1881 – 30 December 1975) was a French musician, conductor and musicologist.

After studying at the conservatory of Lille where he obtained the first prize for viola, he continued in Paris where he worked in harmony, pipe organ (with Abel Decaux), counterpoint (with Albert Roussel) and musical composition (with Vincent d'Indy). 

He became conductor at the Haendel Society, Kapel meister at the Saint-Eustache church in Paris then director of the Philharmonic Orchestra of Reims for 50 years.

Félix Raugel was also an historian of the organ and the author of several works about this instrument, and also Palestrina, L'oratorio, and Le chant choral.

References

External links  
 Félix Raugel on musimem.com
 Félix Raugel on Encyclopédie Larousse
 Félix Raugel on the Académie française

20th-century French musicologists
People from Saint-Quentin, Aisne
1881 births
1975 deaths